The Cathedral of Our Lady of Egypt, also called Coptic Catholic Cathedral of Cairo, is a Coptic Catholic church building at 39 Mustafa Fahmi Street in Cairo, Egypt.

The cathedral serves as the main church of the Catholic Coptic Patriarchate of Alexandria (Patriarchatus Alexandrinus Coptorum) which began in 1741 as an apostolic vicariate created by Pope Benedict XIV. It was elevated to its present status in 1895 under the pontificate of Pope Leo XIII with the papal bull “Christi Domini".

It is under the pastoral responsibility of the Patriarch Ibrahim Isaac Sidrak.

See also
Catholic Church in Egypt
Our Lady of Egypt Church

References

Eastern Catholic cathedrals in Egypt
Cathedrals in Cairo
Coptic Catholic cathedrals